On 4 December 2003, a Polish Mi-8 helicopter operated by the 36th Special Aviation Regiment carrying Poland's Prime Minister Leszek Miller crashed near Piaseczno, just outside Warsaw. The pilot performed an autorotation landing in a forest following the failure of both engines.  The helicopter suffered extensive damage and was written off as a total loss, but despite the severity of the crash there were no fatalities. Fourteen of the 15 people on board were injured, including Leszek Miller, who had two of his thoracic vertebrae broken.

Aircraft and pilot
The helicopter was 26 years old at the time of the crash, and was close to the end of its service life. It belonged to the 36th Special Aviation Regiment responsible for transporting Polish government officials.  The pilot of the helicopter was major Marek Miłosz, later promoted to lieutenant colonel.

Cause
The cause of the engine failure was determined to be icing.

Trial
On 10 March 2004, Miłosz was criminally charged with violating flight safety rules and causing the crash.  Specifically, the pilot was blamed for not manually turning on the deicing equipment during the flight. The pilot argued that the meteorologic information available to him at the time did not indicate that icing was likely, and hence he was not required to turn on the deicing equipment.  He was consulting a thermometer during the flight, but it suffered from a systematic measurement error and hence was unable to warn of icing. In addition, during the flight an unusual thermal inversion occurred; the temperature rose with altitude, which the pilot could not have predicted.
In March 2010, the 6-year trial ended with a verdict of not guilty. The judge in the case noted the pilot expertly carried out the difficult autorotation landing and that the passengers survived because of his superb piloting skills. Leszek Miller declared that if he had to fly again in a helicopter in difficult atmospheric conditions, he would choose Miłosz as his pilot.

See also
2010 Polish Air Force Tu-154 crash, where the Polish president and many politicians, military officers and clerics from Poland died

References 

Polish Air Force Mi-8 Crash
Mi-8 Crash
Aviation accidents and incidents in Poland
Polish Air Force Mi-8 Crash 2003
Aviation accidents and incidents involving state leaders
Polish Air Force
December 2003 events in Europe
2003 disasters in Poland